Elections to Suffolk County Council took place on 2 May 2013 as part of the 2013 United Kingdom local elections. 75 councillors were elected from 63 electoral divisions, which returned either one or two county councillors each by first-past-the-post voting for a four-year term of office. The electoral divisions were the same as those used at the previous election in 2009.

Labour and the Conservatives were the only parties with candidates standing in all sixty-three electoral divisions. 

All locally registered electors (British, Irish, Commonwealth and European Union citizens) who were aged 18 or over on Thursday 2 May 2013 were entitled to vote in the local elections. Those who were temporarily away from their ordinary address (for example, away working, on holiday, in student accommodation or in hospital) were also entitled to vote in the local elections, although those who had moved abroad and registered as overseas electors cannot vote in the local elections. It is possible to register to vote at more than one address (such as a university student who had a term-time address and lives at home during holidays) at the discretion of the local Electoral Register Office, but it remains an offence to vote more than once in the same local government election.

Summary
The Conservative Party won a total of 39 seats, a net loss of sixteen, retaining  a reduced overall majority of three seats. The Labour Party regained their position as the largest opposition party, making a net gain of 11 seats. The UK Independence Party also made gains, winning nine seats on the County Council. The Liberal Democrats lost seats to the Conservatives and to Labour, winning the same number of seats as they won in 2005, seven. Three independent candidates were elected, while the Green Party retained their two seats.

Results across the county were far from uniform.  In the Suffolk Coastal district area, the Conservatives held their own, and in the Babergh district they actually made a net gain of 1 seat (Hadleigh) from the Liberal Democrats.

Mid Suffolk saw just one seat (Stowmarket South) change hands by a single vote, with UKIP gaining from the Conservatives.  The Conservatives also made a net loss of two seats in St Edmundsbury after losing two seats to UKIP in Haverhill and one to an Independent in Bury St Edmunds, but then regained Hardwick from the Liberal Democrats. In other districts, however, the Conservatives lost significant ground.  In Ipswich, they were reduced to a sole representative in the town after losing 4 seats and thus reversing the gains they had made in the 2009 election. After almost wiping the board in 2009, the party also suffered major losses in Waveney with 7 seats transferring to Labour and UKIP.  A further two divisions switched from Conservative to UKIP in Forest Heath.

Labour made a strong recovery in Ipswich, with the party almost completely recovering from its heavy losses in the town in 2009 and returned to the Council with its best cohort since 2005 taking 10 of the 13 seats.  The party also made a modest recovery in the Waveney area with a further 5 gains from the Conservatives.  This though, was still 4 seats short of the 9 seats they secured in 2005.  In other areas of the county, the Labour recovery failed to gain traction.  They won no seats in Haverhill, Bury St Edmunds and Sudbury, which all had Labour councillors until 2009.

The Liberal Democrats made losses in three of the four seats where their incumbent councillors were not seeking re-election but held the seven seats where they had sitting councillors.

The Green Party retained its two seats with increased majorities in each, but were unable to add to their tally.

Independent councillors Richard Kemp and Trevor Beckwith retained their seats, and were joined by David Nettleton, who gained one of the Tower seats in Bury St Edmunds from the Conservatives.

Government Formation

With 39 seats and a third successive victory, the Conservatives were able to form a working majority of 3 in the new Council, with Cllr Mark Bee (Beccles) elected as Council Leader.  Cllr Mark Bee retired as Leader in May 2015 and returned to the back benches. He was subsequently replaced by Cllr Colin Noble (Row Heath), who narrowly defeated rival Cllr Jenny Antill (Cosford) in the ensuing leadership election.

The Conservatives' majority was cut to 1 in May 2016 with the loss of Haverhill Cangle to UKIP.  Four months later, Hadleigh was gained by the Liberal Democrats in a further by-election and the Conservatives lost their overall majority although continued to run the Council as a minority administration for the remainder of its term.

Labour leader Sandy Martin (St John's) became leader of opposition, and David Wood (Peninsula) became Lib Dem group leader.

Overall Result

|}

Results by District

Babergh

District Summary

Division Results

Forest Heath

District Summary

Division Results

Ipswich

District Summary

Division results

Mid Suffolk

District Summary

Division results

Suffolk Coastal

District Summary

Division results

St. Edmundsbury

District Summary

Division results

				

						

}

Waveney

District Summary

Division results

}

				

}

	

}

						

}

References

External links
Results for Suffolk County Council Elections 2013

2013 English local elections
2013
2010s in Suffolk